Geritola liana is a butterfly in the family Lycaenidae. It is found in Cameroon, the Central African Republic, the Democratic Republic of the Congo, Uganda and north-western Tanzania.

References

Butterflies described in 1954
Poritiinae